The Animalize World Tour was a concert tour by American rock band Kiss in support of their twelfth studio album, Animalize.

Background
This was the first tour with Bruce Kulick on lead guitar, replacing Mark St. John who couldn't play due to his arthritic condition. Originally Kulick was a temporary replacement, but St. John's condition did not improve, and Kulick was named an official member on December 8, 1984 after three shows with Mark St. John.

According to Pete Bishop, a reporter from The Pittsburgh Press, the design of the stage featured a leopard-zebra appearance taken from the cover of the album Animalize. The lighted band logo was hung over the upstage portion with specials effects also featuring blasting caps and sparkler jets. There was also colored lights on trusses and beneath meshwork ramps. A truss would lift downwards to lift up the guitarists and lift them to a catwalk, descending down later on a smoke spewing platform.

The Animalize period was the band's most successful of the decade with the crossover success of "Heaven's on Fire" onto CHR/Top 40 radio, a very well-attended concert trek, and with Animalize selling nearly 2 million copies by the end of the tour. The live video Animalize Live Uncensored was recorded at Cobo Hall on December 8, 1984 during this tour, later airing on MTV.

In the tour program for the band's final tour, Simmons reflected on the tour:

Reception
Linda Moleski, a reporter from Billboard, who had attended the performance in Uniondale began her review by noting that the theatrics had not been toned down, but had toned down in appearance. She praised the concert as a 'powerful metal fury', but said she was disappointed from the performance of "Heaven's on Fire" as it was delivered more weakly and harshly. She pointed out the strong connection with both the audience and the players, even praising the uncluttered stage.

Jeff Bunch, a correspondent from The Spokesman-Review was not impressed from the band's performance in Spokane, stating that they were nothing more than a 'play-it-loud-and-say-it-crude' band and suggested that 'if the rumors that rock 'n roll died, it was true. He criticized that the band were strutting around on stage in a graphic matter while Stanley spent more time telling stories than singing - while noting the band having the audience on their feet throughout the whole performance. He concluded his review by stating that the band's success was relied on playing music loud and throwing in many theatrics as possible. He however, claimed that the opening act played to a better-than-average reception.

Setlist
These are example setlists of what was performed during the tour on each leg, but may not represent the majority of the tour.

Europe setlist
 "Detroit Rock City"
 "Cold Gin"
 "Strutter"
 "Fits Like a Glove"
 "Heaven's on Fire"
 "Under the Gun"
 "War Machine"
 "Young and Wasted"
 "I've Had Enough (Into the Fire)"
 "I Love It Loud"
 "I Still Love You"
 "Creatures of the Night"
 "Love Gun"
 "Rock and Roll All Nite"
Encore
 "Lick It Up"
 "Black Diamond"

North America setlist
 "Detroit Rock City"
 "Cold Gin"
 "Creatures of the Night"
 "Fits Like a Glove"
 "Heaven's on Fire"
 "Under the Gun"
 "War Machine" 
 "Young and Wasted"
 "I Love It Loud"
 "I Still Love You"
 "Love Gun"
 "Black Diamond"
Encore
 "Lick It Up"
 "Rock and Roll All Nite"

Tour dates 

 Mark St. John performed at these shows.

Box office score data

Personnel 
 Paul Stanley – vocals, rhythm guitar
 Gene Simmons – vocals, bass
 Eric Carr – drums, vocals
 Bruce Kulick – lead guitar, backing vocals
Additional musician
 Mark St. John – lead guitar, backing vocals

References

Sources

Kiss (band) concert tours
1984 concert tours
1985 concert tours